Glossop is a market town in the High Peak district of Derbyshire, England. The town and surrounding areas, which include Dinting and Old Glossop, contain 56 listed buildings that are recorded in the National Heritage List for England. All the listed buildings are designated at Grade II, the lowest of the three grades, which is applied to "buildings of national importance and special interest". The town originated in what is now Old Glossop, where the older buildings are to be found, and in the 19th century its centre moved to the southwest, into the area known as New Glossop, or Howard Town. Most of the listed buildings are houses, cottages and farmhouses and associated structures, and the others include churches and items in churchyards, chapels, some of which have been converted for other uses, shops, public houses, public buildings, a market cross, a drinking trough, a former cotton mill, a railway station, a school, a bank, a theatre, a war memorial, and a pair of telephone kiosks.


Buildings

References

Citations

Sources

 

Lists of listed buildings in Derbyshire
L